The 2008 Toledo Rockets football team represented the University of Toledo during the 2008 NCAA Division I FBS football season. Toledo competed as a member of the West Division of the Mid-American Conference (MAC). The Rockets were led by Tom Amstutz in his eighth and final year as head coach.

Toledo finished the year 3–9 overall and 2–6 in conference play. The season highlight was a 13–10 victory over the Michigan Wolverines; Michigan entered the game 24–0 against MAC teams.

Schedule

References

Toledo
Toledo Rockets football seasons
Toledo Rockets football